An Interview with God is a 2018 drama film directed by Perry Lang and written by Ken Aguado. The film stars David Strathairn, Brenton Thwaites, Yael Grobglas, Hill Harper and Charlbi Dean.

Premise 

Paul Asher (Brenton Thwaites), an up-and-coming journalist, returns home from covering the war in Afghanistan to find his life falling apart. His marriage is near collapse, and he's in the grips of a personal crisis he struggles to understand. And more pressing, a soldier he befriended on the front lines is waging his own battle after discharge and Paul is desperately trying to rescue him. But the young reporter's life takes a strange turn when he is offered an opportunity too intriguing to resist—an interview with a man (David Strathairn) claiming to be God.

Production 

The film was financed by Giving Films, a company that specializes in movies with Christian themes and donates its profits to faith-based nonprofit organizations. It was shot entirely in New York City; McGolrick Park and Kings Theatre are prominently featured. The film's musical score, featuring the use of a solo cello, was composed by Ian Honeyman.

Release 

The film was released on 900 screens on August 20, 2018 by Fathom Events. It was screened for potential foreign buyers at the 2018 Cannes Film Festival.

The film debuted on Netflix on March 1, 2019.

Reception 

Critical reception to the film was mixed. Matt's Movie Reviews described the film as "a spiritual journey of the cinematic kind that is as fulfilling as it is perplexing, just as it should be." The Christian Film Review praised the story and acting in what they regarded as "a gripping and thrilling film." The Sydney Morning Herald criticized the writing, arguing that scenes with the two leads "go on for pages of dialogue, a sure way to stop a movie dead in its dramatic tracks."

Other media 
Robert Noland and screenwriter Ken Aguado self-published a novelization of the film in 2018. In 2019, the Theatre Guild of Simsbury, a community theater in Connecticut, hosted a staged reading.

References

External links 

2018 films
Films about Christianity
2010s English-language films
American drama films
Films directed by Perry Lang
2010s American films